Baikunth Lal Sharma (Prem) (17 December 1929 – 28 September 2019)  was an Indian politician from Delhi. He was a member of Parliament during 10th and 11th Lok Sabha from East Delhi as a BJP candidate.

Sharma was elected to the Lok Sabha in 1991 from North-East Delhi, when he defeated HKL Bhagat of Indian National Congress. In 1996, he retained his seat, defeating the Congress candidate Deep Chand Bandhu. He lost the 2009 General Election from the same constituency.

References

1929 births
2019 deaths
India MPs 1991–1996
India MPs 1996–1997
Bharatiya Janata Party politicians from Delhi
People from Firozpur district
Lok Sabha members from Delhi
People from East Delhi district